Miss Shilling's orifice was a very simple technical device created to counter engine cut-outs experienced during negative G manoeuvres in early Spitfire and Hurricane fighter aeroplanes during the Battle of Britain. Officially called the R.A.E. restrictor, it was referred to under various names, such as Miss Tilly's diaphragm or the Tilly orifice in reference to its inventor, Beatrice "Tilly" Shilling.

Engine cut-out problems

Early versions of the Rolls-Royce Merlin engine came equipped with dual-choke updraught SU carburettor. When an aeroplane equipped with such an engine performed a negative G force manoeuvre (pitching the nose hard down), fuel was forced up to the top of the carburettor's float chamber rather than down into the engine, leading to loss of power. If the negative G continued, fuel collecting in the float chamber would force the float to the floor of the chamber. Since this float controlled the needle valve that regulated fuel intake, the carburettor would flood and drown the supercharger with an over-rich mixture. The consequent rich mixture cut-out would shut down the engine completely.

During the Battles of France and Britain, the German fighters had fuel injected engines and therefore did not suffer from this problem as the injection pumps kept the fuel at a constant pressure. The German pilots could exploit this by pitching steeply forward while opening  the throttle, a manoeuvre that the pursuing British would be unable to emulate. The British countermeasure, a half roll so the aircraft would only be subjected to positive G as it followed German aircraft into a dive, could take enough time to let the enemy escape.

The Tilly orifice
Complaints from pilots over engine cut-out during dives and brief inverted flight led to a concentrated search for a solution. Engine manufacturer Rolls-Royce produced an improved carburettor, but this failed in testing. It was Beatrice 'Tilly' Shilling, an engineer working at the Royal Aircraft Establishment at Farnborough, who came up with a simple device which could be fitted without taking the aircraft out of service. She designed a thimble-shaped brass flow restrictor with precisely calculated dimensions to allow just enough fuel flow for maximum engine power. It came in two versions, one for 12 psi manifold pressure and another for the 15 psi achieved by supercharged units. The design of the thimble-shaped flow restrictor was later refined to a more simplified flat brass washer.

While not completely solving the problem, the restrictor, along with modifications to the needle valve, permitted pilots to perform quick negative G manoeuvres without loss of engine power. This improvement removed the RAF's Rolls-Royce Merlin-powered fighters' drawback versus the German Messerschmitt Bf 109E machine, whose Daimler-Benz DB 601 inverted V12 powerplant had utilised fuel injection since 1937. During early 1941, Shilling travelled with a small team to fit the restrictors in one RAF base after another, giving priority to front-line units. By March 1941 the device had been installed throughout RAF Fighter Command. Officially named the 'R.A.E. restrictor', the device was immensely popular with pilots, adopting the affectionate nickname 'Miss Shilling's orifice' or simply the 'Tilly orifice', given to the restrictor by Sir Stanley Hooker, the engineer who led supercharger development at Rolls-Royce at the time.

This simple measure was only (and was literally) a stopgap: it did not allow inverted flight for any length of time. The problems were not finally overcome until the introduction of the Bendix pressure carburettor in 1943.

References

Sources

 
 
 
Originally published as

Further reading
Negative Gravity, the Life of Beatrice Shilling, by Matthew Freudenberg

External links
Video explaining the Merlins carburettor and the Tilly orifice

Rolls-Royce aircraft piston engines